Brown Lake or Lake Brown may refer to:

Australia
Brown Lake (Stradbroke Island), a lake in Queensland
Brown Lake (Western Australia), a lake in Western Australia
Lake Brown (Western Australia), two lakes of the same name in Western Australia

Canada
Ellen Brown Lake, a lake in Pictou County, Nova Scotia
John Brown Lake, a lake on Vancouver Island, British Columbia

United States

Brown Lake (Pulaski County, Arkansas), a lake in Pulaski County, Arkansas
Brown Lake (Saline County, Arkansas), a lake in Saline County, Arkansas
Lake Brown (Fulton County, Arkansas), a lake in Fulton County, Arkansas
Lake Brown (Grant County, Arkansas), a lake in Grant County, Arkansas
Brown State Fishing Lake, a protected area in Brown County, Kansas
Brown Lake (New York), a lake in Hamilton County
Lake Brown, officially Edgar Brown Lake, South Carolina
Brown Lake, Washington, an unincorporated community

See also
 Browne Lake (disambiguation)
 Browns Lake (disambiguation)